Trevor Lummis (25 August 1930 – 23 September 2013)  was an English writer and historian. He was Honorary Treasurer of the Oral History Society and held an Honorary Fellowship in the Department of Sociology at the University of Essex.

Early occupation and education
He spent ten years as an Able Seaman in the Merchant Navy, before resuming studies as a mature student at the New Battle Abbey College.  He subsequently graduated from the University of Edinburgh, University of London and University of Essex.  He specialised in 19th and 20th century social and oral history.

Drew University listed Lummis among their faculty in 2011.

Consultancy for television documentary
It was transmitted in March 1999 on Channel 4, British Television.

Research and teaching experience

At the University of Essex his research work was in social history through oral history methods. After working as research assistant on Family Life and Work Experience before 1918, he was senior research officer on The Family and Community Life of East Anglian Fishermen (Social Science Research Council grant HR 2656/1), which focused in particular on the working environment and its effect on industrial and community relations.

He subsequently worked on The Systematic Analysis of Life Histories (Social Science Research Council grant HR 7841), which coded oral interviews for computer archiving and analysis. All projects were directed by Paul Thompson, and Lummis was the sole researcher on the two numbered projects.  He is a past Honorary Treasurer of the Oral History Society and held an Honorary Fellowship in the Department of Sociology at Essex.

During the above period he  taught on the Social History courses both at undergraduate and graduate level. He also worked as a tutor-counsellor for the Open University Social Science Course. Other teaching was with the London Programme of Drew University, USA.

Bibliography

Books
 Pacific Paradises: The Discovery of Tahiti and Hawaii, Sutton Publishing, Stroud. 2005.
 Pitcairn Island: Life and Death in Eden, Ashgate, London. 1997.
 Re-issued as:
 Life and Death in Eden:Pitcairn Island and the Bounty mutineers. Victor Gollancz, London. 1999.
 Life and Death in Eden:Pitcairn Island and the Bounty mutineers. Orion Books, Phoenix Paperback, London. 2000.
 Life and Death in Eden: Pitcairn Island and the Bounty mutineers. Victor Gollancz. London. 1999.
 Life and Death in Eden: Pitcairn Island and the Bounty mutineers. Orion Books, Phoenix Paperback. London. 2000.
and in translation.
 Italian. L’Ultimo uomo del Bounty. Piemme. 2000.
 Dutch. Leven en dood in het paradijs. Uitgeverij Atlas. 2001.
 The Labour Aristocracy 1851-1914. Scholar Press. 1994.
 The Woman's Domain. Co-author Jan Marsh. Viking/National Trust. 1990.
 Listening to History: the authenticity of oral evidence, Hutchinson. 1987; also Barnes and Noble Books. New Jersey. USA, 1988.
 Occupation and Society: the East Anglian fishermen 1880-1914, Cambridge University Press. 1985.
 Living the Fishing. With Paul Thompson and Tony Wailey. Routledge and Kegan Paul. 1983.

Articles and essays.
Structure and Validity in Oral Evidence, The Oral History Reader (eds) Robert Perks and Alistair Thomson, Routledge. 1998
Oral History Reprinted in Folklore, Cultural Performances, and Popular Entertainments, Richard Bauman (ed.), Oxford University Press, 1992.
Oral History, International Encyclopaedia of Communications, Erik Barnouw (ed.), Oxford University Press, 1986.
Contributor to the Open University's East Anglian Studies Resource Pack, and presenter of the Oral History Cassette which is part of it. 1984
The Historical Dimension of Fatherhood: a case study 1890-1914, in L. McKee and M. O'Brien (eds), The Father Figure, Tavistock, 1982
Structure and Validity in Oral Evidence, International Journal of Oral History, June, 1981, U.S.A.
The Class Perceptions of East Anglian Fishermen: an historical dimension through oral evidence, British Journal of Sociology, March, 1979
Historical Data and the Social Sciences, Open University Cassettes, D301.06 to D301.11, 1974.
Charles Booth: Social Scientist or Moralist?, Economic History Review, February, 1971.

Distinctions
1982-86   Honorary Treasurer of the Oral History Society.
1984-86   Honorary Fellow of the Department of Sociology, University of Essex.

References

1930 births
2013 deaths
Academics of the University of Essex
Alumni of the University of Edinburgh
Alumni of the University of London
Alumni of the University of Essex
British Merchant Navy personnel
English historians